Arun Pudur is the founder and group president of Celframe Corporation.

Early life and education
Pudur was born in Chennai, but his family shifted to Bengaluru, as his father used to stay 7 to 8 months a year there. His father, Sri Ranga, was a cinematographer. Pudur is a graduate of the University of Bangalore, majoring in Business Management.

Career
 
Pudur founded Celframe in 2001.Billionaire.com in August 2015 reported that Celframe earned revenues of $6.8 billion the previous year. The article says Celframe's original uptick in software sales was thanks to a change from a distributor to a partner model in 2005.
 
In addition to technology, Pudur has various businesses including real estate, gold, and mining.

See also
 List of people from Tamil Nadu

References

External links
 
 

1977 births
21st-century Indian businesspeople
Bangalore University alumni
Indian billionaires
Living people
Businesspeople from Chennai